Patrick Baldassarre (born 3 May 1986) is a Swiss professional basketball player for Kleb Basket Ferrara of the Italian Serie A2 Basket.

Professional career
In 2018, he joined Benacquista Assicurazioni Latina of the Italian Serie A2 Basket. In the summer of 2019, he signed with the team's competitor Kleb Basket Ferrara. In June 2020, he extended with Ferrara for another year.

Swiss national team
Baldassarre has been a member of the Swiss national basketball team.

References

External links
FIBA Profile 
Profile at REALGM.com
Profile at Eurobasket.com

1986 births
Living people
People from Sion, Switzerland
Small forwards
Swiss expatriate basketball people in Italy
Swiss men's basketball players
Sportspeople from Valais